The Hilltop Stakes is an American ungraded Thoroughbred horse race for three-year-old fillies over  a distance of one mile on turf held annually at Pimlico Race Course in Baltimore, Maryland.

History

The Hilltop Stakes was run on the second Saturday of May each year exactly one week prior to the Preakness Stakes. In 2015 the race was scheduled on the Friday, the day before the Preakness. when the Black-Eyed Susan Stakes is held. The race is named in honor of the nickname for Pimlico Race Course. The nickname "Old Hilltop" was given to the venerable track in Baltimore, Maryland because of a large hill in the infield that was very prominent and gave race goers a 360" bird's-eye view of the entire track. In 1938 the hill top was leveled so that movie cameras and patrons in the grandstand could see the race on the backside of the track while the horses were racing.

The race was run on the main track on a dirt surface prior to 1988. It was also run on the main track in 1995 and 2003 due to a yielding turf and poor weather. In 1997, Francine Villeneuve became the first female jockey to win the race.

Records 
 
Speed record: 
  miles - 1:41.40 - Captive Miss  (1992) 
 1 mile - 1:36.20 - Another Paddock  (1988)

Most wins by a jockey:
 3 - Gregg McCarron (1974, 1978, 1989)
 3 - Mario Pino (1987, 1999, 2002)
 3 - John R. Velazquez (2011, 2012, 2015)

Winners of the Hilltop Stakes

See also 

 Hilltop Stakes top three finishers
 Pimlico Race Course
 List of graded stakes at Pimlico Race Course

References 

Flat horse races for three-year-old fillies
Turf races in the United States
Ungraded stakes races in the United States
Sports competitions in Baltimore
Pimlico Race Course
Horse races in Maryland
Recurring sporting events established in 1973